ZeniMax Online Studios LLC is an American video game developer and a subsidiary of ZeniMax Media, specializing in massively multiplayer online games. The company developed The Elder Scrolls Online and its downloadable content. ZeniMax Online Studios had around 250 employees in 2012. In addition to the main Hunt Valley, Maryland based office, ZeniMax Online also maintains a customer support center in Galway, Ireland as well as an additional office in Austin, Texas.

History
The formation of ZeniMax Online Studios was announced by ZeniMax Media on August 1, 2007, to be headed by Matt Firor, a massively multiplayer online game designer and veteran of Mythic Entertainment.

The company was built to specialize in the creation of a massively multiplayer online game. In 2007 the company announced a partnership with Simutronics for the use of HeroEngine. In June 2008, ZeniMax Online Studios moved into its current office in Hunt Valley. On March 15, 2010, ZeniMax Online Studios announced that it will be using the Fork Particle SDK to create the particle effects in its unannounced upcoming massively multiplayer game. On March 15, 2011, ZeniMax Online Studios announced plans to open a customer support center in Galway, Ireland. The company's new facility will provide customer support for players of their future massively multiplayer online games and is expected to result in the creation of hundreds of jobs over the next several years. On August 8, 2011, ZeniMax Online Studios selected Splunk to be its platform for business intelligence, network operations monitoring, and operational intelligence. On March 6, 2012, ZeniMax Online Studios signed a licensing deal with Elastic Path Software. On May 3, 2012, Game Informer announced that ZeniMax Online Studios's video game in development will take place in The Elder Scrolls universe, approximately a millennium before the events of The Elder Scrolls V: Skyrim. The game, The Elder Scrolls Online, was released in 2014.

In December 2020, ZeniMax Online Studios formed a satellite office in San Diego to work on an original intellectual property.

Games developed

References

External links
 

2007 establishments in Maryland
American companies established in 2007
Companies based in Rockville, Maryland
Video game companies of the United States
Video game development companies
Video game publishers
ZeniMax Media
American corporate subsidiaries
Video game companies established in 2007